Harvela Investments Ltd. v Royal Trust of Canada (CI) Ltd. [1986] 1 AC 207  is a legal case decided by the House of Lords in 1986 defining the law of England and Wales regarding referential bids in competitive tenders.

Facts
The Royal Trust Company owned shares in a company, and invited bids for them. Harvela bid $2,175,000 and Sir Leonard Outerbridge bid:

"$2,100,000 or $101,000 in excess of any other offer expressed as a fixed monetary amount, whichever is higher."
The Royal Trust accepted Sir Leonard's bid as being $2,276,000. Harvela sued for breach of contract, saying a referential bid was invalid. The Court of Appeal held in favour of the Royal Trust, that expressing a fixed amount made the referential bid valid.

Judgement
The House of Lords unanimously reversed the Court of Appeal's decision. Lord Templeman, in his judgement, pointed especially to South Hetton Coal Co. v. Haswell, Shotton and Easington Coal and Coke Co. [1898] 1 Ch. 465, where Sir Nathaniel Lindley MR had dealt with referential bids previously (233-4).

Lord Diplock died three months after giving his judgement (11 July 1985), aged 78. He put his opinion in the following way:

Lord Bridge added that the referential bid can only be ascertained in amount after the deadline has fallen for all bids to come in.

References

See also
Invitation to treat
Agreement in English law

English agreement case law
House of Lords cases
1986 in case law
1986 in British law